Richard L. Thomason is an American businessman and politician serving as a member of the South Dakota House of Representatives from the 13th district. Elected in November 2020, he assumed office on January 12, 2021.

Early life and education 
Thomason was born in Louisville, Kentucky and moved with his family to Sioux Falls, South Dakota in 1994. After graduating from Lincoln High School, he earned a Bachelor of Science degree in real estate from the University of St. Thomas in Minneapolis.

Career 
Outside of politics, Thomason works as a real estate broker and evaluator. He was elected to the South Dakota House of Representatives in November 2020 and assumed office on January 12, 2021. In the 2021–2022 legislative session, Thomason is a member of the House Local Government Committee and House Taxation Committee.

References 

Living people
People from Louisville, Kentucky
People from Sioux Falls, South Dakota
University of St. Thomas (Minnesota) alumni
Republican Party members of the South Dakota House of Representatives
Year of birth missing (living people)